Technology transfer in computer science refers to the transfer of technology developed in computer science or applied computing research, from universities and governments to the private sector. These technologies may be abstract, such as algorithms and data structures, or concrete, such as open source software packages.

Examples 
Notable examples of technology transfer in computer science include:

References 
Computer science
Computer science
Computing-related lists